"Heaven" is a song by DJs Shaun Frank and Kshmr. It features Delaney Jane. Described as future house, the song was released through Spinnin' Records.

Music video 
The official music video, directed by Tyler Hynes and premiered by Billboard, was released. The song was remixed by Two Friends.

Track listing

Charts

References 

2015 songs
2015 singles
Spinnin' Records singles
Electronic songs
Kshmr songs